Waka Waka, Wakka Wakka or variants thereof may refer to:

 WakaWaka, an enterprise for solar products
 Waka waka (dance), a folk dance in Bolivia and Peru
 Wakka Wakka, an Aboriginal Australian people of the state of Queensland
 Wakka Wakka language, an Aboriginal Australian language
 "Waka Waka (This Time for Africa)", a 2010 song by Shakira and the official song of the 2010 World Cup
 "Waka Waka", a song by Yemi Alade from Mama Africa

See also
 Waka (disambiguation)
 Wagga Wagga, a city in Queensland
 "Wocka Wocka!", catchphrase of the Muppet Fozzie Bear